The Rashtrapati Niwas, formerly known as Viceregal Lodge, is located on the Observatory Hills of Shimla, Himachal Pradesh, India. It was formerly the residence of the British Viceroy of India. It houses some of the most ancient articles and photographs going back to the times of the British rule in India.

The Viceregal Lodge was designed by British architect Henry Irwin and built in the Jacobethan style during Lord Dufferin’s tenure as Viceroy. Its construction started in 1880 and was completed in 1888. Lord Dufferin occupied the lodge on 23 July 1888. The final cost of project was around 38 lakh (3,800,000) rupees with the annual upkeep cost being around 1.5 lakh (150,000) rupees in the 1880s. The structure draws inspiration from the architectural style of the English Renaissance, and also reflects elements of the castles of the Scottish Highlands. The building is of light blue-grey stone masonry with tiled pitch roofing. The interior of the main building is noted for elaborate woodwork which has stood the test of time. Teak was brought from Burma, and was supplemented by local cedar wood and walnut.

History 

The Shimla conference convened by Lord Wavell in 1945 to approve the Wavell Plan for Indian Self Government was hosted at this estate. The summer capital of India was of little use to the President of India who visited it only for a few days in the year, if at all. Professor S. Radhakrishnan thought of putting it to academic use. The Rashtrapati Niwas Estate was transferred to the Ministry of Education to be handed over to the Indian Institute of Advanced Study. The C.P.W.D., the Himachal Pradesh High Court, and the Himachal Pradesh University were allowed in due course to use some of its buildings but the bulk of the Estate, including its well kept lawns and rich greenhouse, has remained in use for the Indian Institute of Advanced Study.

References

See also

 List of official residences of India
 Government Houses of India
 Government Houses of the British Empire

Official residences in India
Government Houses of the British Empire and Commonwealth
Buildings and structures in Shimla
Houses completed in 1888
Government buildings completed in 1888
Jacobethan architecture
1888 establishments in India
Presidential residences in India